Mei Kebao (born March 1957) is a retired Chinese politician. Before his retirement, he was deputy director of the General Administration of Quality Supervision, Inspection and Quarantine. Previously he served as deputy party chief of Hunan, party chief of Changsha, party chief of Hengyang, and party chief of Chenzhou. In all, he had serve in four cities at municipal level of the Communist government. 

He was a delegate to the 16th and 17th National Congress of the Communist Party of China. He was also an alternate member of the 17th and 18th CPC Central Committee.

Biography
Mei was born in Hanshou County, Hunan, in March 1957. After the Resumption of University Entrance Examination in 1977, he was accepted to Hunan University of Arts and Science, majoring in agriculture. After graduation, he taught there. He also studied as a part-time student at Hunan Agricultural University, Central South University and the Central Party School of the Communist Party of China.

Mei joined the Communist Party of China in May 1979 and entered the workforce in February 1980.

In December 1985 he was promoted to become deputy party chief of Changde County, a position he held until February 1987.

He was deputy secretary of Hunan Provincial Committee of the Communist Youth League in February 1987, and held that office until July 1992.

In July 1992, he was transferred to Liuyang and appointed the party chief, the top political position in the city.

In September 1994, he was transferred again to Chenzhou, where he served as party chief there.

In February 1999, he was elected party chief of Hengyang, replacing Yan Yongsheng.

In August 2001, Mei was transferred to Changsha, capital of central China's Hunan province, as the top political position in the city.

In November 2006 he was promoted again to become deputy party chief of Hunan, he remained in that position until January 2013, when he was transferred to Beijing and appointed deputy director of the General Administration of Quality Supervision, Inspection and Quarantine.

Mei retired in May 2017.

References

External links

1957 births
Politicians from Changde
Living people
Hunan Agricultural University alumni
Central South University alumni
Hunan University of Arts and Science alumni
Central Party School of the Chinese Communist Party alumni
People's Republic of China politicians from Hunan
Chinese Communist Party politicians from Hunan